Latex rubber is used in the manufacture of many types of clothing. It has traditionally been used to make protective clothing, including gas masks and Wellington boots. Mackintoshes have traditionally been made from rubberized cloth. However, rubber has now generally been replaced in these applications by synthetic polymers. 

Latex rubber as a clothing material is common in fetish fashion and among BDSM practitioners, and is often worn at fetish clubs. Latex is sometimes also used by couturiers for its unusual appearance. There are several magazines dedicated to the use and wearing of it. Latex clothing tends to be skin-tight, but less commonly it can be loose-fitting.

Design and manufacture

There are a handful of companies around the world which manufacture latex rated as suitable for contact with human skin. These firms supply sheet (in the vast majority) to a larger number of smaller fashion clothing companies. In the past, some marketplaces suffered from de facto monopoly supply conditions, where a sheet supplier could impose restrictive ordering requirements. Only being able to order half-kilometre long batches of sheet in the colour and thickness they wanted, meant that designers and clothing producers often had to co-operate, or face long delays in supplying their customers, if they wanted to be in the rubber clothing business.

Since 2000, however, the sheet market has been exposed to competition courtesy of the Internet. This has produced an explosion in cottage industry scale latex fetish clothing manufacturers.

Latex sheet-based clothing is constructed by a three-stage process. First, a pattern for a specific garment is selected, and adjusted carefully to suit the measurements supplied by the customer. Then the sheet latex is cut out on a flat board, by hand: lastly, latex glue (generally rubber cement solvent-based adhesives) is used to join seams together. Skilled latex makers can build a stocking, shaped to match the contours of a specific person's leg, made from latex only 0.2 mm thick, in under an hour. It is possible to use water-based glues such as Copydex to make latex clothes; however, the long-term durability of items made this way is somewhat dubious.

Latex moulded clothing is produced by dipping a mould into a vat of liquid rubber. Dealing with raw liquid latex is more difficult because of the extra effort that must be put in to keep the thickness of the latex itself consistent.  Because of this, improper molding techniques can lead to inconsistent thickness in the latex, causing it to fail at the weak points faster than items made from sheet latex.  This has led to a major stigma against molded latex garments, in favor of sheet latex versions. This stigma has been detrimental to those few latex providers who have proper mold-making techniques.  When done properly, a molded latex garment is just as durable as sheet latex, and it is a preferred method for skilled individuals making items with heavy contours like hoods or gloves.  Despite any attempt to use sheet latex to make hoods and gloves, it is impossible to get solid sheets to fit complex contours as well as a molded latex item can.  The belief that all sheet latex is superior to all molded latex is completely false, and ultimately it depends on the abilities of the creator, as even poorly made sheet latex can fall apart easily.  Sheet latex is the preferred method for items like catsuits, that do not need such perfect form fitting, and are easier to create with sheets compared to the large molds required for bodysuits.

While there is little difference in latex clothing made from liquid latex versus sheet latex in the hands of a skilled artisan, liquid latex is cured via air drying while sheet latex is cured by being vulcanized. This makes the two forms slightly different. Due to the difference in curing, liquid latex can be applied to sheet latex clothing to add unique patterns and designs, which can be peeled off the sheet latex afterwards.

Neither moulded nor sheet-based latex is amenable to large-scale mass production. Skilled manual artistry is an integral part of the process; this means that made-to-measure and special designs are much more accessible to the general buyer, in looking at fetish latex, than is the case with regular textiles.

Use in clothing 

Latex has been used to make leotards, bodysuits, stockings and gloves, besides other garments. Latex is also often used to make specialist fetishistic garments like hoods and rubber cloaks.

Latex clothing is generally made from large sheets of latex, which are delivered in rolls. The "classic" colour for fetishistic latex clothing is black, but latex is naturally translucent and may be dyed any colour, including metallic shades or white. It can come in thicknesses which generally range from about 0.18 mm to 0.5 mm. Instead of being sewn, latex clothing is generally glued along its seams.

Because latex sheet is relatively weak, latex clothing needs special care to avoid tearing. While latex can be repaired using materials similar to those provided in a bicycle repair kit, the result is rarely as attractive as the original appearance of the garment.

Latex clothing is often polished to preserve and improve its shiny appearance. 

Putting on latex clothing can be difficult, because latex has high friction against dry skin. To make it easier to put on, wearers often use talc to reduce friction against the skin when putting the clothes on; then, because stray talc is very visible against the rubber, wearers generally polish off any visible talc. Another method of dressing is using lubricant (lube) which provides a slippery surface for the latex to glide over.  A third method of reducing or eliminating the high friction of latex when dressing is to chlorinate the rubber.  Chlorine in gaseous form is generated by the reaction of hydrochloric acid and sodium hypochlorite.  This chlorine bonds to the first few molecules on the surface of the isoprene (latex) and transforms them into neoprene. This process affects metallic colours, but does not affect strength.

Latex may also be painted directly onto the body as latex in liquid form, which is also sometimes used to close seams in the creation of latex clothing. Removal of a painted on liquid latex garment can result in painful hair removal.  Wearers avoid this by preparing the skin by prior hair removal, the use of release agents to prevent the latex adhering to the hair, or using products such as orange oil to weaken the latex during removal.

Use of latex clothing has been popularized by media appearances, such as the outfit of Catwoman, a cat burglar, in Batman Returns or the outfits in The Matrix which are mostly made of latex, like popular celebrities Kim Kardashian, Lady Gaga, Kylie Jenner, Pamela Anderson, Shania Twain, Eliza Dushku, and Emma Watson has worn latex in publicity events or hangouts.

Use in fetish community 

Latex clothing is a popular feature of the BDSM community. Latex or rubber fetishists sometimes refer to themselves as "rubberists". One reason why latex or other tight shiny fabrics may be fetishised is perhaps that the garment forms a "second skin" that acts as a fetishistic surrogate for the wearer's own skin. Thus, wearers of skin-tight latex or PVC garments may be perceived by the viewer as being naked, or simply coated in a shiny substance like paint. Latex can also be polished to be shiny and can also be produced in bright colours, adding further visual stimulus to add to the physical sensations produced by the material. The tightness of the garments may also be viewed as a kind of sexual bondage.

See also 
 Fetish fashion
 Leather subculture
 Lolita fashion
 Modest fashion
 PVC clothing
 Swim cap

References

External links 

 

BDSM equipment
Clothing by material
Fetish clothing
Paraphilias
Rubber products
Sportswear